Wickford is a town and civil parish in the south of the English county of Essex, with a population of 33,486. Located approximately 30 miles (50 km) east of London, it is within the Borough of Basildon along with the original town of Basildon, Billericay, Laindon and Pitsea. 

Wickford has a main high street which includes a wide range of shops. It also has a swimming pool, library, open-air market and a community centre within the vicinity of the town centre.

History 
Wickford has a history going back over two thousand years. There is evidence that the area itself was inhabited in prehistoric times probably by a tribe of Britons called Trinovantes. There was a Roman military marching camp on the Beauchamps Farm site, which was succeeded by a Roman villa. This is now the site of Beauchamps High School. This area on higher ground was the historic core of Wickford, the site of the manor house and the parish church of St Catherine's. Over time, the commercial centre of Wickford has migrated westwards towards the modern High Street on the other side of the River Crouch.

The place name 'Wickford' is first attested in a Saxon charter of 995, where it appears as Wicford; it appears in the Domesday Book of 1086 as Wincfort. The name means 'ford by a wych elm or ford by a dairy-farm'.

Before the 20th century, Wickford was an agricultural village. At the time of the Domesday Survey, six land-holders were recorded. Historically, there have been only two considerable estates in Wickford: the manor of Wickford Hall and the manor of Stilemans. Robert Wikeford or de Wickford (c.1320–90), Archbishop of Dublin, was born in Wickford and his family are thought to have been Lords of the Manor of Wickford Hall.

Governance
Wickford was an ancient parish in the county of Essex and, from 1894, had a parish council. In 1934, the parish council was abolished when the town became part of Billericay Urban District. The civil parish was re-created on 1 April 2022. The first town councillors took office following an uncontested election in May 2022, and the council held its first meeting on 16 May 2022 at the Wick Community Centre.

American relations 
The village of Wickford in Rhode Island, United States, is believed to have been named after this town.

Wickford was also the English birthplace of Elizabeth Reade (1615–72), the second wife of John Winthrop the Younger (1606–76), Governor of Connecticut; she was also a step-daughter of Hugh Peter (1598–1660), a prominent supporter of the Parliamentary cause during the English Civil War.

Naturism 
Wickford became the birthplace of Naturism in the United Kingdom; in 1924, the English Gymnosophist Society was formed and had its home in the town.

Second World War 
During the Second World War, the edge of the town was hit by a German doodlebug and, on 6 December 1944, a V-2 rocket fell in Branksome Avenue, about a mile west of the town centre. Around the town, in amongst the hedgerows and fields, there are numerous pillboxes constructed as a part of British anti-invasion preparations.

1958 flood 
In 1958, Wickford town centre was hit by a flood which made national news headlines. The most striking image of the flood was a double-decker bus, left stranded at Halls Corner overnight, partly submerged by the floodwater. A second flood, in 1960, meant that changes were made to the course of the River Crouch; this included turning the river into a concrete channel through the centre of the town, although this may be removed in the coming years, depending on the scale of the Wickford Masterplan (see below).

Geography 

The River Crouch flows through the town, from the west to the east. The River Wick flows into the River Crouch from the south.

The built-up area of Wickford extends into the neighbouring parishes of Runwell to the north and Shotgate to the east.

Wick Country Park
The Wick Country Park comprises  of former agricultural land, with over 2 km (1 1/4 miles) of easy access trails around the site. The trails leads visitors past old hedgerows, the  lake, ponds, World War II pillboxes and recent woodland plantings; bridges and boardwalks allow the trails to continue over the North Benfleet brook.

Neighbouring towns and villages
 Basildon
 Billericay
 Rayleigh
 South Woodham Ferrers
 Battlesbridge
 Crays Hill
 Downham
 Ramsden Bellhouse
 Ramsden Crays 
 Ramsden Heath
 Rawreth
 Rettendon
 Runwell
 Shotgate
 South Hanningfield
 West Hanningfield

Transport

Railway

Wickford railway station is situated on the Shenfield to Southend Line, which provides train services between London Liverpool Street and Southend Victoria. A journey to London takes approximately 40 minutes.

The Crouch Valley Line is a branch line that operates generally hourly services from Wickford to Southminster.

Services are operated by Abellio Greater Anglia.

Buses
Bus services in Wickford are operated primarily by First Essex, but also by Stephensons of Essex and NIBS Buses. 

Routes include:
 14 Wickford - Hanningfields - Chelmsford 
 25 Basildon - Southend
 251 Warley - Brentwood - Wickford
 X10 Basildon - Chelmsford - Stansted Airport

Roads
The town can be reached easily via the A127, which connects east London and Southend-on-Sea, and by the A130 from Chelmsford.

The Master Plan

The Wickford Masterplan was first unveiled at the Wickford Community Centre in December 2004 and published in November 2005 by DTZ Pieda Consulting, at a budget of £125 million, and many of the developments are currently in progress. At the heart of the proposals is the redevelopment of the High Street, which will be redesigned to be the town's premier meeting place. The Masterplan would create new public spaces, enhance the retail environment through the renewal of retail floor space and bring the market into the street scene, promoting urban living above shops and on the existing market site.

Adjacent to the River Crouch, a number of high quality residential developments promoted as the "Town Centre Riverside Living" complex would revitalise the riverside as a public asset and promotion of new eating and drinking opportunities. In addition, a new residential development to the west of Market Avenue will be constructed.

Promoting the station entrances on both sides of the railway line as key gateways to Wickford are also key areas of the plan, which would enhance transport interchange facilities and bring forward the car park site on Station Road for development as a new multi-storey car park and mixed-use development. As of present only the northern side of the station facing The Broadway is easily accessible, with the southern London-bound track only accessible from the outside though a small out-of-way footpath from Market Avenue as a courteous entrance for wheelchair-using passengers.

Public and health services would be improved under the scheme, with the re-organisation of existing health, library and community services into a new 'iconic' building to the east of Market Avenue as an integrated community service facility.

The Eastern Extension would create a better presence and new linkages to the east of the town centre by redeveloping the car park into a multi-storey development with residential and live-work uses and a new housing scheme to the east of Wickford Bypass. The Southern Gateway area, which surrounds London Road and the southern end of the High Street, are also planned to undergo a transition with a strong leisure and recreational theme, building on existing eating and drinking facilities and incorporating compatible residential uses.

Overall 650 apartments are planned to be built as part of the Masterplan as officially stated by councillor Tony Ball, although other sources opposed to the project claim this figure is closer to 735.

Opposition
The Masterplan has met with resistance with many residents of Wickford, mainly due to overall cost, and also the fear from some older residents that raising the level of the river could see repeats of the floods in 1958 and 1960.

There have also been criticism over the number of developments being constructed, which some say threaten to overdevelop and cause environmental and aesthetic damage to the town centre whilst providing minimal improvements to public services; one such group is the Wickford Action Group who has campaigned against many of the revisions made prior to the public approval of the plan.

Progress
Construction began in earnest in February 2007, which saw the demolition of many of the buildings in Lower Southend Road to make way for a new residential area. As of December 2009 this development has been partially completed (Riverside Place phase 1 + Riverside Court), however the compulsory purchase order of the post sorting office has been withdrawn leaving the fate of Riverside Place Phase 2 in doubt.

As of April 2010, the whole of the Masterplan project is facing serious delays and construction has halted due to the global financial crisis. In May 2009 the construction company Bradgate Developments released a statement assuring residents the project was still on track.

Proposed super-max prison
Plans to build  a prison capable of accommodating up to 1,500 inmates on land formerly of the Runwell Hospital mental institute were scrapped. The land is now a housing estate.

Notable people

Jordan Banjo
 Robert Wikeford or de Wickford, (1330–1390), Archbishop of Dublin, was born in Wickford, where his family are said to have been Lords of the Manor of Wickford Hall.
 Chantelle Houghton, winner of Celebrity Big Brother 2006 lives in Wickford.
 Capital Radio Afternoon DJ Chris Brooks lives in Wickford.
 Southend United's previous manager Steve Tilson.
 Comedy Actors/writers Rhys Thomas and Tony Way are both from Wickford.
 Tony Stockwell – A British author, television personality and psychic medium.
 Ryan Cleary (hacker)
 Jon Morter (notable for the Rage Against the Machine and The Justice Collective UK Christmas No.1 singles) used to run a Rock music night in Wickford.
 Julian Dicks, former West Ham United and Liverpool FC footballer lives in Wickford.

References

External links
 Basildon Borough History – Wickford & Shotgate

 
Towns in Essex
Civil parishes in Essex
Borough of Basildon